Aequispirella tenuilirata is an extinct species of sea snail, a marine gastropod mollusk, unassigned in the superfamily Seguenzioidea.

Distribution
Fossils of this marine species were found in New Zealand.

References

tenuilirata
Gastropods described in 1924
Gastropods of New Zealand